Linda Kutrowski is a former Canadian athlete. She won three Paralympic gold medals and one bronze in 1992, 1996, 2000, and 2004. She was inducted into the Canadian Wheelchair Basketball Hall of Fame in 2011.

References

Living people
Paralympic gold medalists for Canada
Paralympic bronze medalists for Canada
Year of birth missing (living people)
Medalists at the 2004 Summer Paralympics
Medalists at the 2000 Summer Paralympics
Medalists at the 1992 Summer Paralympics
Medalists at the 1996 Summer Paralympics